Pringsewu Regency is a regency of Lampung Province, Sumatra, Indonesia. It has an area of 625 km² and had a population of 364,825 people at the 2010 Census and 405,466 at the 2020 Census; the official estimate as at mid 2021 was 406,823. The regency seat is the town of Pringsewu, located 37 kilometres from the provincial capital of Bandar Lampung. The regency was created on 29 October 2008 from the former eastern part of Tanggamus Regency.

The regency name came from Javanese language terms "Thousand (sewu) bamboo (pring)", as the location of the town was once a bamboo forest.

Administrative districts
Administratively at 2010 the regency was divided into eight districts (kecamatan). However, since 2010 a ninth district (Pangelaran Utara) has been created from part of the existing Pangelaran District, bringing the total to nine districts. Each district has the same name as the district's administrative centre. These are tabulated below with their areas and their populations at the 2010 Census and the 2020 Census, together with the official estimates as at mid 2021. The table also includes the number of administrative villages (rural desa and urban kelurahan) in each district and its post code. 

Note: (a) the 2010 population for the new Pangelaran Utara District is included with the figure for Pangelaran District, from which it was separated.

References

Regencies of Lampung